Danielle Bunten Berry (February 19, 1949 – July 3, 1998),  formerly known as Dan Bunten, was an American game designer and programmer, known for the 1983 game M.U.L.E., one of the first influential multiplayer video games, and 1984's The Seven Cities of Gold.

In 1998, she was awarded the Lifetime Achievement Award by the Computer Game Developers Association. In 2007, the Academy of Interactive Arts & Sciences chose Berry as the 10th inductee into its Hall of Fame.

Early life 
Berry was born in St. Louis, Missouri and moved to Little Rock, Arkansas as a junior in high school. She was the oldest of six siblings. While growing up in Little Rock, Berry's family didn't always have enough money to make ends meet, so Berry took a job at a pharmacy. She also held a leadership role with the Boy Scouts.

According to Berry, one of her fondest childhood memories involved playing games with her family. She was quoted saying, “When I was a kid, the only times my family spent together that weren't totally dysfunctional were when we were playing games. Consequently, I believe games are a wonderful way to socialize.”

While attending the University of Arkansas, she opened up her own bike shop called Highroller Cyclerie. Berry acquired a degree in industrial engineering in 1974 and started programming text-based video games as a hobby. After she graduated from college, she was employed by the National Science Foundation, where she created urban models before starting a job at a video game company.

Career 
In 1978, Berry sold a real-time auction game for the Apple II titled Wheeler Dealers to a Canadian software company, Speakeasy Software. This early multiplayer game required a custom controller, raising its price to USD$35 in an era of $15 games sold in plastic bags. It sold only 50 copies.

After producing three titles for SSI, Berry, who by then had founded a software company called Ozark Softscape, caught the attention of Electronic Arts founder Trip Hawkins. M.U.L.E. was Berry's first game for EA, originally published for the Atari 8-bit family because the Atari 800 had four controller ports. Berry later ported it to the Commodore 64. While its sales - 30,000 units - were not high, the game developed a cult following and was widely pirated. The game setting was inspired by the novel Time Enough for Love by Robert A. Heinlein.

Along with the success of M.U.L.E., Berry also had close ties with the games Robot Rascals, Heart of Africa, and Cartels & Cutthroat$.  Throughout her career, she was involved in the creation of 12 games, 10 of which revolved around multiplayer compatibility. The only two which didn't have a multiplayer focus were Seven Cities of Gold and Heart of Africa.

Berry wanted to follow up M.U.L.E. with a game that would have been similar to the later game Civilization, but after fellow Ozark Softscape partners balked at the idea, Berry followed with The Seven Cities of Gold, which proved popular because of its simplicity. By the time the continent data were stored in the computer's memory, there was little left for fancy graphics or complex gameplay - the game had only five resources. It was a hit, selling more than 150,000 copies.

The follow-up game, Heart of Africa, appeared in 1985 and was followed by Robot Rascals, a combination computer/card game that had no single-player mode and sold only 9,000 copies, and 1988's Modem Wars, one of the early games played by two players over a dial-up modem. Modem Wars was ahead of its time, as few people in the late 1980s had modems in their homes.

Berry departed EA for MicroProse. Allegedly, Trip Hawkins, CEO of EA, did not feel that pushing production of games onto a cartridge based system was a good idea. The shift was important to Berry, as computer games had previously been distributed on floppy discs, and a changeover to a cartridge system would allow games to be played on Nintendo systems. This was a significant factor in her decision to leave. She then developed a computer version of the board game Axis and Allies, which became 1990's Command HQ, a modem/network grand strategy wargame. Berry's second and last game for MicroProse was 1992's Global Conquest, a 4-player network/modem war game. It was the first 4-player network game from a major publisher. Berry was a strong advocate of multi-player online games, observing that, "No one ever said on their deathbed, 'Gee, I wish I had spent more time alone with my computer.'"

A port of M.U.L.E. to the Mega Drive/Genesis was cancelled after Berry refused to put guns and bombs in the game, feeling it would alter the game too much from its original concept.  In 1997, Berry shifted focus to multiplayer games over the Internet with Warsport, a remake of Modem Wars that debuted on the MPlayer.com game network.

Less than a year after the release of Warsport, Berry was diagnosed with lung cancer presumably related to years of heavy smoking. She died on July 3, 1998. At the time, she was working on the design of an Internet version of M.U.L.E..

M.U.L.E 

The game's primary premise consisted of players playing with and against one another to establish total control over a planet. The name of the game stands for Multiple Use Labor Element. The game was originally made for the Atari 400 and Atari 800 but was later developed to be compatible with the Commodore 64, NES, and IBM pcjr. The game has a maximum of four players. Players are given different options and choices, and are allowed to create their colony the way they see fit. This can be done by changing races and giving respective colonies different advantages that will impact the way the game is played and determined later on down the line.

Ultimately there are two ways in which players can win the game. The first way is by having the most money out of all four players, and the second way is by being able to survive the colony itself. The game focuses heavily on going out and retrieving resources that can be used to benefit their character. Items such as food, energy, and crystite are some of a number of in-game items that players are able to retrieve and use to better themselves. In order for a player to be able to access these items, they will first have to have access to a M.U.L.E. The acquisition of these items has a direct reflection on what the player will be allowed to do. For example, if a player doesn't have enough food, they will have less time during their turn.

The Seven Cities of Gold 

The Seven Cities of Gold was originally intended to be another multiplayer game. It was originally a single player format, focused heavily on having the players travel around the map and collect items to help them strengthen their colony. Once they felt as though they had a solid colony, the players could battle each other to see who could overtake who. After much consideration, Ozark Software came to the conclusion that this would not be doable. Instead, they went with a formula that had the game focus solely on developing a colony.

Ozark Softscape 
Ozark Softscape was a computer game development team consisting initially of Berry, her brother Bill Bunten, Jim Rushing, and Alan Watson. Ozark was run out of Berry's basement. The company was based out of Little Rock, Arkansas and had profound success with a few of their early titles. Ozark Softscape had a publishing deal with Electronic Arts for several of its groundbreaking games. In the early 1990s, Ozark Softscape left its partnership with Electronic Arts over a dispute to port some games to cartridge format for the Nintendo Entertainment System. It began a partnership with MicroProse to produce two more titles: Command HQ and Global Conquest. A dispute occurred over creating a follow-up to M.U.L.E. with Sega in 1993, and the company dissolved. The employees of Ozark Softscape moved to different areas of the software industry.

Personal life 
Berry was married three times. Berry had three children, one daughter and two sons.

After a third divorce, Berry, who had until then been living as male, transitioned to living as a woman. Berry underwent sex reassignment surgery in November 1992 and afterward kept a lower profile in the games industry. Berry later regretted having surgery, finding that for her, the drawbacks of surgical transition outweighed the benefits, and wishing she had considered alternative approaches. It caused difficulties in family relationships, and led to her being shunned by the video game industry. She joked that the surgery was to improve the industry's male/female ratio and aesthetics, but advised others considering a sex change not to proceed unless there was no alternative and warned them of the cost, saying "Being my 'real self' could have included having a penis and including more femininity in whatever forms made sense. I didn't know that until too late and now I have to make the best of the life I've stumbled into. I just wish I would have tried more options before I jumped off the precipice."

After her transition in fall 1992, Berry stayed out of the video game spotlight, mostly keeping to herself. She felt as though that after transitioning she was not as good at video game development as she had previously been, stating "So, I'm a little more than three years into my new life role as Ms. Danielle Berry, and her career looks to be somewhat different from old Mr. Dan Bunten's. For one thing, I'm not as good a programmer as he was."

On July 3, 1998, Berry died of lung cancer.

Games 

Wheeler Dealers (1978)
Computer Quarterback (1981)
Cartels & Cutthroats (1981)
Cytron Masters (1982)
M.U.L.E. (1983)
The Seven Cities of Gold (1984)
Heart of Africa (1985)
Robot Rascals (1986)
Modem Wars (1988)
Command HQ (1990)
Global Conquest (1992)
Warsport (1997)

Recognition 
Although many of Berry's titles were not commercially successful, they were widely recognized by the industry as being ahead of their time. On May 7, 1998, less than two months before her death, Berry was awarded the Lifetime Achievement Award by the Computer Game Developers Association.

In 2000, Will Wright dedicated his blockbuster hit The Sims to Berry's memory. In 2007, the Academy of Interactive Arts & Sciences chose Berry to be inducted into its Hall of Fame. Sid Meier, the mastermind behind the video game series Civilization, inducted her at the Hard Rock Hotel in Las Vegas.

Berry was known as someone who was very easy to talk to. If someone recognized her in public, she would be more than delighted to have a conversation with them.

In 2012, Arkansas Times wrote that Berry "is still considered something of a rock star among game designers and those interested in the history of games", crediting her emphasis on social interaction in gaming.

See also 

 Dona Bailey
 Jamie Fenton
 Lucy Gilbert
 Patricia Goodson
 Rebecca Heineman
 Amy Hennig
 Brenda Laurel 
 Suki Lee
 Cathryn Mataga
 Carla Meninsky
 Laura Nikolich
 Carol Shaw
 Joyce Weisbecker
 Anne Westfall
List of programmers
List of women in the video game industry
Women and video games
Women in computing

References

External links 

 Danielle Bunten Berry profile at MobyGames
 A tribute to Berry by Greg Costikyan
 A tribute to Berry from Gamasutra
 
 
 Dani Bunten Berry named to the Academy of Interactive Arts
 Article from The Arkansas Times about Bunten and M.U.L.E.
 Ozark Softscape: Creators of M.U.L.E.

1949 births
1998 deaths
Academy of Interactive Arts & Sciences Hall of Fame inductees
American video game designers
Artists from Little Rock, Arkansas
Deaths from lung cancer in Arkansas
LGBT people from Arkansas
LGBT people from Missouri
MicroProse people
People from St. Louis
Transgender women
Video game programmers
Women video game programmers
Women video game designers
20th-century American LGBT people